Gene Vincent and the Blue Caps is an album by Gene Vincent and His Blue Caps. It was originally released in 1957, four months after its predecessor, Bluejean Bop!. It was released on the Capitol label. It was re-released on CD in 2002. Cliff Gallup and rhythm guitarist, Willie Williams, had left the Blue Caps in the fall of 1956. Gallup was persuaded by producer, Ken Nelson, to temporarily rejoin for the sessions that resulted in the album.

Track listing

Side 1
"Red Blue Jeans and a Pony Tail" (Jack Rhodes, Bill "Tex" Davis) – 2:14
"Hold Me, Hug Me, Rock Me" (Gene Vincent, Davis) – 2:15
"Unchained Melody" (Alex North, Hy Zaret) – 2:37
"You Told a Fib" (Vincent, Cliff Gallup) – 2:21
"Cat Man" (Vincent, Davis) – 2:18
"You Better Believe" (Gallup) – 2:01

Side 2
"Cruisin'" (Vincent, Davis) – 2:12
"Double Talkin' Baby" (Danny Wolfe) – 2:12
"Blues Stay Away from Me" (Henry Glover, Wayne Raney, Alton Delmore, Rabon Delmore) – 2:16
"Pink Thunderbird" (Paul Peek, Davis) – 2:32
"I Sure Miss You" (Charles Matthews) – 2:38
"Pretty, Pretty Baby" (Wolfe) – 2:27

2002 CD reissue bonus tracks
"Important Words" [version one] (Vincent, Davis) – 2:21
"B-I-Bickey-Bi, Bo-Bo-Go" (Don Carter, Dub Nalls, Jack Rhodes) – 2:16
"Five Days, Five Days" (Rhodes, Willey, Franks) – 2:37
"Teenager Partner" [version one] (Vincent, Davis) – 2:14
"Five Feet of Lovin'" [version one] (Buck Peddy, Melvin Tillis) – 2:06

Personnel
 Gene Vincent – guitar, vocals

The Blue Caps
 Cliff Gallup – lead guitar
 Paul Peek – rhythm guitar
 Willie Williams – rhythm guitar (tracks 4, 11)
 Jack Neal – upright bass
 Dickie Harrell – drums
with:
 The Jordanaires – backing vocals on "You Better Believe", "Important Words" (version one) and "Five Days, Five Days"

References

External links
 
 Gene Vincent and the Blue Caps at Rate Your Music

1957 albums
Albums produced by Ken Nelson (United States record producer)
Capitol Records albums
Gene Vincent albums